Mukim Tanjung Semberong or Tanjung Sembrong (also known as Mukim 7) is a mukim located in Batu Pahat district in Johor. Batu Pahat district is divided into 14 mukims, each of which encompasses several villages.

External links 
 Pejabat Daerah Batu Pahat.
 Pecahan daerah Batu Pahat.

Mukims of Batu Pahat District